Brian James Lavender (born April 20, 1947 in Edmonton, Alberta) is a Canadian former professional ice hockey player. Lavender was a forward who played 184 games in the National Hockey League for the California Golden Seals, Detroit Red Wings, St. Louis Blues, and New York Islanders between 1971 and 1974. He would also play 37 games in the World Hockey Association for the Denver Spurs and Ottawa Civics during the 1975–76 season.

Career statistics

Regular season and playoffs

External links
 

1947 births
Living people
California Golden Seals players
Canadian expatriate ice hockey players in the United States
Canadian ice hockey forwards
Cleveland Barons (1937–1973) players
Denver Spurs (WHA) players
Denver Spurs (WHL) players
Detroit Red Wings players
Houston Apollos players
Montreal Voyageurs players
New York Islanders players
Ottawa Civics players
Providence Reds players
Regina Pats players
Ice hockey people from Edmonton
St. Louis Blues players
Virginia Wings players